Romanno Bridge is the sixth novel by Scottish writer Andrew Greig.

Plot summary

The book is a sequel to Greig's second novel, The Return of John MacNab. It reunites the main characters from the previous book, and teams them with a half-Maori rugby player and a busker from Oslo, in a quest for the Stone of Scone. The action takes place mainly in Scotland, but it also includes sections set in Norway and England.

Like The Return of John MacNab, this novel is something of a homage to the stories of John Buchan, although the connection is not made explicit this time around.

See also 

 Novel in Scotland

2008 British novels
Novels by Andrew Greig
Scottish novels
Novels set in Scotland
Sequel novels
Quercus (publisher) books